Donald Thomas or Don Thomas may refer to:

 Donald A. Thomas (born 1955),  American engineer and former NASA astronaut
 D. M. Thomas (Donald Michael Thomas, born 1935), Cornish novelist, poet, and translator
 Donald Serrell Thomas (1934–2022), British writer of (primarily) Victorian-era historical, crime and detective fiction 
 Donald Thomas (high jumper) (born 1984), Bahamian high jumper
 Donald Thomas (American football) (born 1985), American football guard
 Donald Thomas (racing driver) (1932–1977), stock car racing driver
 Donnie Thomas (American football) (1953–2017), American football linebacker
 Donald W. Thomas (1953–2009), university administrator and ecologist 
 E. Donnall Thomas (1920–2012), American physician, developer of bone marrow transplant
 Donnie Thomas (US Army), former commander of Guantanamo's Joint Detention Group
 Don Thomas, alias of comic character of Blue Streak

See also
Don Tomas (disambiguation)